PEN centres are the federated members of PEN International.

List 
According to the website of PEN International.

Africa 
 Afar Centre
 Afrikaans Centre
 Algerian Centre
 Egyptian Centre
 Eritrean Centre in Exile
 Ethiopian Centre
 Gambia Centre
 Ghanaian Centre
 Guinea-Bisseau Centre
 Guinean Centre
 Ivory Coast Centre
 Kenyan Centre
 Liberian Centre
 Malawian Centre
 Mali Centre
 Mauritania Centre
 Moroccan Centre
 Nigerian Centre
 Senegal Centre
 Sierra Leone Centre
 Somali-Speaking Centre
 South African Centre
 Togo Centre
 Tunisian Centre
 Ugandan Centre
 Zambian Centre
 Zimbabwe Centre

Asia Pacific 

 Afghan Centre
 All-India PEN Centre Theosophy Hall, Bombay
 Bangladesh Centre
 Cambodian Centre
 Central Asia PEN
 Chinese Center
 Guangzhou Chinese Centre
 Hong Kong (Chinese Speaking) Centre
 Hong Kong (English Speaking) Centre
 Independent Chinese Centre
 Japanese Centre
 Kazakhstan Centre
 Korean Centre
 Melbourne Centre
 Mongolian Centre
 Myanmar Centre
 Nepalese Centre
 New Zealand Centre: New Zealand Society of Authors (PEN New Zealand)
 North Korean Writers in Exile Centre
 PEN Delhi Centre
 Perth Centre
 Philippine Centre: Philippine Center of International PEN
 Shanghai Centre
 Sydney Centre: Sydney PEN
 Uyghur Centre
 Tapei Chinese Centre
 Tatar Centre
 Thai Centre
 Tibetan Writers Abroad Centre

Europe 
 Albanian Centre
 Armenian Centre
 Austrian Centre
 Basque Centre
 Belarusian Centre: forcibly dissolved by the Supreme Court of Belarus on 9 August 2021.
 Belgian (Dutch Speaking) Centre
 Belgian (French-speaking) Centre
 Bosnian Centre: PEN Bosnia and Herzegovina
 Bulgarian Centre
 Catalan Centre
 Centre de la Langue d'Oc
 Centre of German-Speaking Writers Abroad
 Chechen Writers Centre
 Croatian Centre
 Cypriot Centre: Cypriot PEN
 Czech Centre
 Danish Centre
 English Centre: English PEN
 Esperanto Centre
 Estonian Centre
 Finnish Centre
 French Centre
 Galician Centre
 Georgian Centre
 German Centre: PEN Centre Germany
 Hungarian Centre: Hungarian PEN
 Icelandic Centre
 Iranian PEN Centre in Exile
 Irish Centre
 Italian Centre
 Kosovan Centre
 Kurdish Centre: Kurdish PEN
 Latvian Centre
 Liechtenstein Centre
 Lithuanian Centre
 Macedonian Centre
 Moldovan Centre
 Monegasque Centre
 Montenegrin Centre
 Netherlands Centre
 Norwegian Centre
 Polish Centre
 Portuguese Centre
 Roma Centre
Romanian Centre: PEN Romania
 Russian Centre
 Sardinian Centre
 Scottish Centre
 Serbian Centre
 Slovak Centre
 Slovene Centre
 Spanish Centre
 St Petersburg Centre
 Swedish Centre
 Suisse Romand Centre
 Swiss German Centre
 Swiss Italian and Reto-Romansh Centre
 Turkey Centre
 Trieste Centre
 Ukrainian Centre
 Writers from former Yugoslavia Centre
 Writers in Exile, German Centre
 Writers in Exile, London Centre

Latin America and The Caribbean 

 Argentinian Centre
 Bolivian Centre
 Brazilian Centre
 Chilean Centre
 Colombian Centre
 Guadalajaran Centre
 Guatemalan Centre
 Haiti Centre
 Honduras Centre
 Jamaican Centre
 Mexican Centre
 Nicaraguan Centre
 Panamanian Centre
 Paraguayan Centre
 Peruvian Centre
 Puerto Rican Centre
 San Miguel de Allende Centre
 Uruguayan Centre
 Venezuelan Centre

Middle East 
 Bahrain Centre
 Iraq Centre
 Israeli Centre
 Jordanian Centre
 Lebanese Centre
 Palestinian Centre

North America 
 American Centre: PEN America
 Canadian Centre: PEN Canada
 Chinese Writers Abroad Centre
 Cuban Writers in Exile Centre
 Quebecois Centre: Centre québécois du P.E.N. international (P.E.N. Québec) 
 Vietnamese Abroad Centre: Vietnamese Abroad PEN Centre
 Writers in Exile, American Centre

References

External links 
 PEN Centres, PEN International

 

Writing-related lists